Queen's Quay railway station (also referred to as Belfast Queen's Quay) served the east of Belfast in Northern Ireland. It was formerly one of the three terminus railway stations in Belfast.

History

Belfast and County Down Railway
Queen's Quay station was opened in 1848 as Belfast and was the terminus of the Belfast, Hollywood & Bangor Railway. The Belfast and County Down Railway opened an adjacent station two years later, both stations merging after a further two years.

Ulster Transport Authority / Northern Ireland Railways
The station and its lines were taken over by the Ulster Transport Authority in 1948, who then set about closing large portions of the County Down network. The lines from Queen's Quay to Ardglass, Comber and Newcastle were withdrawn in January 1950. The line to Donaghadee was then removed in April 1950. This left Queen's Quay for the remainder of its years as a fairly quiet terminus for the suburban services to and from Bangor. The interior of the station suffered extensive damage from bomb attacks as The Troubles took hold in Northern Ireland, leaving it a mostly-empty shell by the 1970s, when Northern Ireland Railways took over the country's rail network.

A connection was provided at Ballymacarrett Junction to the Belfast Central Railway, which linked to the Great Northern Railway of Ireland at  along a track through the site where  station now stands. This was primarily used only for rolling stock transfers and freight workings, and closed in 1965. The connection and railway line was subsequently rebuilt in 1976 to allow Bangor line services to transfer to Belfast Central and run directly through to the rest of the Northern Ireland railway network.

Following closure
Queen's Quay station was closed on 10 April 1976. The rebuilt chord to Belfast Central was brought into operation the next day, and Bangor Line services began to operate into the city centre and through to the Newry Line. The station's train servicing facilities were then converted for use as Northern Ireland Railways' Central Services Depot, primarily for stock stabling and maintenance. This depot closed in 1994 to make way for the Cross-Harbour Rail Link including the Dargan Bridge, linking the Larne Line to Belfast Central, and the M3 flyover.

Today, nothing of the station or the service depot remains. The site itself is mostly buried under the embankment for the M3 flyover, with only a small section of ground used as a tram stop for the station remaining open, now in use as a car park beside the motorway.

However, the station clock which can be seen in the photograph below titled "Station interior in 1974" was salvaged when the station closed in 1976, and  it still exists today.

Service
At its peak, services ran to Comber (where passengers would change for trains to Ardglass, Downpatrick and Newcastle), Donaghadee, and Bangor. Following takeover and subsequent rationalisation by the UTA, this left only the services to Bangor operating into the NIR era, until the station was closed in 1976.

Gallery

References

Disused railway stations in Belfast
Railway stations opened in 1848
Railway stations closed in 1976
Disused railway stations in County Down
1848 establishments in Ireland
1976 disestablishments in Northern Ireland
Railway stations in Northern Ireland opened in 1848
Railway stations in Northern Ireland opened in the 19th century